Hejian is a county-level city in Cangzhou, Hebei, China.

Hejian may also refer to:
Hejian Kingdom, a kingdom/principality in Chinese history
Hejian, Henan, a town in Linzhou, Henan, China
Hejian Technology Corporation, a Chinese semiconductor foundry company based in Suzhou, Jiangsu, China